Superbia (Latin: pride) may refer to:

 Superbia (film), a 2016 Hungarian animated short by Luca Tóth
 Superbia (musical), an unproduced rock musical by Jonathan Larson
 Antonio Superbia (active from 1986), Brazilian-American footballer
 Superbia, in the DC Comics universe, the mobile city-state base of the International Ultramarine Corps